The Prelude, Op. 28, No. 1, played on the piano, is the first of Chopin's preludes. It was published in 1839 and dedicated to Camille Pleyel. Pianist Vladimir de Pachmann noted this prelude as "The first one is in a style that reminds one very forcibly of Schumann."

Analysis
Marked Agitato ("agitated") and in the key of C major, this prelude is in  time. This prelude lasts from about 40 seconds to one minute and is a mere 34 bars (or measures) long. This prelude consists of 8-bar phrases with a coda in the end of the piece and consists of arpeggios with four-part harmony. Throughout the piece, the piece shifts out of C major but doesn't modulate to a different key. According to Marilyn Anne Meier, an Australian concert pianist, the prelude should be played "…by playing the semiquavers intensely legato, not articulated and separated."

Name
Chopin did not publish any textual names for his preludes However, later pianists Alfred Cortot and Hans von Bülow created nicknames for this piece, Cortot naming this "Feverish anticipation of loved ones" and Bülow naming this "Reunion".

References

External links
OurChopin – Prelude Op. 28 No. 1
Chopin Prelude Op.28 No.1 in C Major Agitato Martha Argerich On YouTube, performed by Martha Argerich
Arthur Rubinstein - Chopin Prelude, No. 1, Op. 28 in C Major On YouTube, performed by Artur Rubenstein

Compositions by Frédéric Chopin
1839 compositions
Compositions for solo piano
Chopin
Compositions in C major